Following is a list of notable film producers, some of whom have also worked in other media.

(list is sorted alphabetically by surname)

A–M

J. J. AbramsLost, Cloverfield, Alias, Mission: Impossible III, Star Trek, Fringe
James AmutaYour Excellency, Oloture
Darla K. AndersonA Bug's Life, Monsters, Inc., Toy Story 3, Coco
Judd ApatowThe Cable Guy, Anchorman, The 40-Year-Old Virgin, Knocked Up, Superbad, Freaks and Geeks
Avi AradSpider-Man, X-Men, Blade
Bonnie ArnoldToy Story, Tarzan, Over the Hedge, How to Train Your Dragon, How to Train Your Dragon 2, How to Train Your Dragon: The Hidden World
Syed Aman BachchanKiragoorina Gayyaligalu, Edegarike, Thamassu, Aa Dinagalu
Lawrence BenderPulp Fiction, Kill Bill, An Inconvenient Truth, Reservoir Dogs, Good Will Hunting
Pandro S. Berman The Hunchback of Notre Dame, The Picture of Dorian Gray
Armyan BernsteinAir Force One, The Hurricane, Children of Men, Bring It On
Charles BrackettThe Lost Weekend, Sunset Boulevard, The King and I
Albert R. Broccoli, Michael G. Wilson, Barbara BroccoliJames Bond film series
Mel BrooksThe Elephant Man, The Fly, Frances, 84 Charing Cross Road, Young Frankenstein
Jerry BruckheimerTop Gun, Crimson Tide, The Rock, Con Air, National Treasure, Pirates of the Caribbean film series
Sandra BullockHope Floats, Gun Shy, Miss Congeniality, Murder By Numbers, Two Weeks Notice, Miss Congeniality 2: Armed and Fabulous, All About Steve, George Lopez (TV series)
Tim BurtonThe Nightmare Before Christmas, Cabin Boy, James and the Giant Peach, 9
Frank Capra It Happened One Night, Mr. Deeds Goes to Town, Lost Horizon, Mr. Smith Goes to Washington, It's a Wonderful Life, State of the Union
Jim CarreyBruce Almighty, Fun with Dick and Jane
Charlie ChaplinCity Lights, Modern Times, The Great Dictator, Limelight
Ethan CoenBlood Simple, Raising Arizona, Barton Fink, Fargo, No Country for Old Men
Harry CohnIt Happened One Night, Twentieth Century, Lost Horizon
Tom CruiseMission: Impossible, Vanilla Sky, Narc, The Others, Minority Report, War Of The Worlds, The Last Samurai 
Cecil B. DeMilleSamson and Delilah, The Greatest Show on Earth, The Ten Commandments, The Buccaneer
Dean DevlinIndependence Day, Godzilla, The Patriot
Walt DisneySnow White and the Seven Dwarfs, Pinocchio, Fantasia, Mary Poppins
Lorenzo di BonaventuraConstantine, Shooter, Transformers
Leonardo DiCaprioThe Aviator, The 11th Hour
Kirk DouglasPaths of Glory, Spartacus
Michael DouglasRomancing the Stone, Jewel of the Nile, One Flew Over the Cuckoo's Nest.
Robert EvansLove Story, The Godfather, Chinatown, The Saint
Douglas FairbanksThe Mark of Zorro, Robin Hood, The Thief of Bagdad
Ted FieldThe Amityville Horror, The Last Samurai, Runaway Bride, What Dreams May Come, Jumanji, Revenge of the Nerds
Arthur FreedMeet Me in St. Louis, An American in Paris, Singin' in the Rain
Mel GibsonBraveheart, The Passion of the Christ
Brian GrazerSplash, The Paper, Apollo 13, How the Grinch Stole Christmas, A Beautiful Mind, Cinderella Man, The Cat in the Hat, The Da Vinci Code, Angels & Demons, Frost/Nixon, Rush, In the Heart of the Sea, Inferno
D. W. GriffithThe Birth of a Nation, Intolerance, Abraham Lincoln
Richard N. GladsteinFinding Neverland, The Bourne Identity, Pulp Fiction, The Cider House Rules
Samuel Goldwyn Ball of Fire, The Best Years of Our Lives, Hans Christian Andersen
Daniel Grodnik, National Lampoon's Christmas Vacation, Bobby,  Powder, Moose
Paul HaggisCrash, Million Dollar Baby, Letters from Iwo Jima
Don HahnWho Framed Roger Rabbit, Beauty and the Beast, The Lion King, The Hunchback of Notre Dame, The Emperor's New Groove, Atlantis: The Lost Empire, The Haunted Mansion, Frankenweenie, Maleficent, Beauty and the Beast (2017 film), Wonder Park
Tom HanksCast Away, Band of Brothers, Mamma Mia, My Big Fat Greek Wedding, The Polar Express, Evan Almighty, My Life in Ruins, City of Ember, The Pacific
David HeymanHarry Potter film series
Alfred HitchcockStrangers on a Train, North by Northwest, Psycho, The Birds
Ron HowardThe Alamo, Curious George, Restless, Cowboys & Aliens, The Good Lie, In the Heart of the Sea
Howard HughesHell's Angels, Scarface, The Outlaw
Peter JacksonThe Lord of the Rings film series, King Kong, District 9, The Hobbit film series
Joseph Janni film producer of over fifty films, including Far from the Madding Crowd, A Kind of Loving, Romeo and Juliet, and Yanks. Worked closely with John Schlesinger.
Howard KazanjianRaiders of the Lost Ark, Return of the Jedi
Jeffrey KatzenbergThe Prince of Egypt, The Road to El Dorado, Shark Tale
Buster KeatonSherlock Jr., The General, Speak Easily
Alexander KordaThings to Come, The Thief of Bagdad, The Third Man
Stanley KubrickFear and Desire, Killer's Kiss, Dr. Strangelove, 2001: A Space Odyssey, A Clockwork Orange, Barry Lyndon, The Shining, Full Metal Jacket, Eyes Wide Shut
Gary KurtzStar Wars, The Empire Strikes Back, The Dark Crystal
Carl LaemmleThe Phantom of the Opera, The Man Who Laughs
Carl Laemmle Jr.Dracula, Frankenstein, Bride of Frankenstein
Jesse L. LaskySergeant York, The Adventures of Mark Twain
Mervyn LeRoyThe Wizard of Oz, The Bad Seed
Val LewtonCat People, The Body Snatcher
Harold LloydSpeedy, Movie Crazy, Professor Beware
Phil Lord and Christopher MillerCloudy with a Chance of Meatballs 2,The Lego Batman Movie, The Lego Ninjago Movie, Spider-Man: Into the Spider-Verse, The Lego Movie 2: The Second Part, The Mitchells vs. the Machines, America: The Motion Picture
Ernst LubitschThe Merry Widow, Ninotchka, Heaven Can Wait
George LucasStar Wars, Indiana Jones
Branko LustigSchindler's List, Gladiator
Joseph L. MankiewiczA Christmas Carol, The Philadelphia Story
Frank MarshallThe Bourne Identity, The Bourne Supremacy, The Bourne Ultimatum, Back to the Future trilogy, Jurassic Park, The Sixth Sense
Louis B. MayerGreed, Ben-Hur, I Take This Woman
Rick McCallumStar Wars
Chris MeledandriDespicable Me, Hop, The Lorax, Despicable Me 2, Minions, The Secret Life of Pets, Sing, Despicable Me 3, The Grinch, The Secret Life of Pets 2
Arnon MilchanPretty Woman, Natural Born Killers, L.A. Confidential, City of Angels, Entrapment, Fight Club, Unfaithful, Daredevil, Mr. & Mrs. Smith, The Fountain, What Happens in Vegas
Patrick MillsapsI'll See You in My Dreams
Walter MirischWest Side Story, The Sound of Music
Hayao MiyazakiSpirited Away, Princess Mononoke, Whisper of the Heart
Scott MosierClerks, Mallrats, Chasing Amy

N–Z

Geoffrey NotkinRadio Free Albemuth, Neil Gaiman: Dream Dangerously, Revenge of Zoe, First to the Moon
Michael NozikSyriana, The Motorcycle Diaries, Quiz Show, The Legend of Bagger Vance, Mississippi Masala
Christine Oestreicher A Shocking Accident (Oscar winner)
Alan J. PakulaTo Kill a Mockingbird, Klute, Starting Over
Nate ParkerBirth Of A Nation (2016),Eden,Portion
Tyler PerryDiary of a Mad Black Woman, Madea's Family Reunion
Julia PhillipsThe Sting, Taxi Driver, Close Encounters of the Third Kind
Erich PommerThe Cabinet of Dr. Caligari, Metropolis, The Blue Angel
Carlo PontiDoctor Zhivago, War and Peace, Attila
Chris PrattThe Tomorrow War
Norman Priggen The Servant, Accident, The Go-Between, The Assassination of Trotsky
 Kori RaeMonsters University, Onward
RamuAK 47, Lockup Death, Kalasipalya, Ganga
Brett RatnerDouble Take, Paid in Full, Santa's Slay, Code Name: The Cleaner, Horrible Bosses, Mirror Mirror, Rules Don't Apply, Georgetown
Jonas RiveraUp, Inside Out, Toy Story 4
Hal Roach Sons of the Desert
Robert RodriguezEl Mariachi, Desperado, From Dusk till Dawn, Grindhouse
Win RosenfeldBlacKkKlansman, Candyman, Wendell & Wild
Albert S. RuddyThe Godfather, Million Dollar Baby, The Longest Yard
Scott RudinNo Country for Old Men, School of Rock, The Royal Tenenbaums, Clueless
Harry SaltzmanJames Bond, Battle of Britain, The Ipcress File
Adam SandlerThe Waterboy, Big Daddy, Little Nicky, The Animal, Mr. Deeds, Eight Crazy Nights, The Hot Chick, Anger Management, 50 First Dates, The Longest Yard, Deuce Bigalow: European Gigolo, Click, Joe Dirt, I Now Pronounce You Chuck and Larry
Joseph M. SchenckOur Hospitality, The General
Martin ScorseseThe Grifters, Naked in New York, The Aviator
David O. SelznickKing Kong, Gone with the Wind, Rebecca, The Third Man
Mack SennettKeystone Cops
Dean SilversFlirting with Disaster, Spanking the Monkey, Manny & Lo
Don SimpsonBeverly Hills Cop, Flashdance, Top Gun
Mireille SoriaSpirit: Stallion of the Cimarron, Sinbad: Legend of the Seven Seas, Madagascar, Madagascar: Escape 2 Africa, Madagascar 3: Europe's Most Wanted, Home, Captain Underpants: The First Epic Movie
Clark SpencerLilo & Stitch, Meet the Robinsons, Bolt, Winnie the Pooh, Wreck-It Ralph, Zootopia, Ralph Breaks the Internet, Encanto
Sam SpiegelThe African Queen, The Bridge on the River Kwai, Lawrence of Arabia
Steven SpielbergThe Goonies, E.T. the Extra-Terrestrial, Poltergeist, Transformers (executive)
David SproxtonChicken Run, Wallace & Gromit: The Curse of the Were-Rabbit, Flushed Away, Arthur Christmas, The Pirates! In an Adventure with Scientists!, Shaun the Sheep Movie, Early Man, A Shaun the Sheep Movie: Farmageddon 
Ben StillerBlades of Glory, Zoolander, The Ruins, Tropic Thunder
Erich von StroheimBlind Husbands, The Wedding March
Josef von SternbergThe Docks of New York, The Scarlet Empress
Gabrielle TanaSomeone Else's America, On the Ropes, The Moth, The Duchess, Coriolanus, The Invisible Woman, Philomena, Run (short), Dancer (Documentary), Mindhorn, Ideal Home, The White Crow, Stan and Ollie, My Zoe (2018)
Quentin TarantinoFrom Dusk till Dawn, Hostel, Grindhouse
Irving ThalbergFreaks, Grand Hotel, Mutiny on the Bounty
Walter WangerStagecoach, Joan of Arc, Cleopatra
Hal B. WallisThe Maltese Falcon, Casablanca, True Grit
Fran WalshThe Lord of the Rings, King Kong, The Lovely Bones, Halo
Aron WarnerAntz, Shrek, Shrek 2, Shrek the Third, Shrek Forever After, Wish Dragon
Jack L. WarnerYankee Doodle Dandy, Casablanca, My Fair LadyRobert WattsReturn of the Jedi, Indiana Jones and the Temple of Doom, Indiana Jones and the Last Crusade, You Only Live TwiceBob WeinsteinRestoration, Mimic, Reindeer Games, Bad SantaHarvey WeinsteinShakespeare in Love, Gangs of New York, Nine, My Week with Marilyn, Tulip FeverOrson WellesCitizen Kane, The Magnificent Ambersons, The Lady from Shanghai, Touch of EvilRalph WinterStar Trek V: The Final Frontier, Star Trek VI: The Undiscovered Country, X-Men, Fantastic Four, X2: X-Men UnitedJanet YangThe Joy Luck Club (film), The People vs. Larry Flynt, Dark Matter (film), Zero Effect, Shanghai CallingEzz El-Dine ZulficarAmong the Ruins, Struggle of the Heroes, Appointment with Life, Appointment with HappinessSaul ZaentzOne Flew Over the Cuckoo's Nest, Amadeus, The English PatientDarryl F. Zanuck The Public Enemy, All About Eve, The Longest DayRobert ZemeckisThe Frighteners, Matchstick Men, Monster HouseWarren ZideAmerican Pie franchise, Final Destination franchise, Cats & Dogs, The Big Hit, High SchoolAdolph ZukorDr. Jekyll and Mr. Hyde, Shanghai Express, Souls at SeaSalah ZulfikarThe Second Man, My Wife, the Director General, A Taste of Fear, The Other Man, I Want a SolutionSee also

Film director
Filmmaking
Lists of film topics
List of television producers
Producers Guild of America

ReferencesThe Producer's Business Handbook by John J. Lee, Jr., Focal Press (2000)From Reel to Deal'' by Dov S-S Simens, Warner Books (2003)